Signaturen is a residential high-rise building in Tønsberg city, Norway. The building is situated in Kaldnes on the northernmost part of the island Nøtterøy in Tønsberg municipality.

The building is owned by the Norwegian residential property developer Selvaag Bolig and completed in early 2019, but was opened for new residents already in December 2018. The construction started in 2017.

The residential building has 13 floors and 23 apartments. The top floor can be reached by either stairs or a high-speed Kone traction elevator. The tower has a neo-futuristic architectural style.

References

External links 
Signaturen on selvaagbolig.no

Residential skyscrapers
Buildings and structures completed in 2018
Buildings and structures completed in 2019
Residential buildings completed in 2019
Modernist architecture in Norway
Postmodern architecture
High-tech architecture
Neo-futurism architecture